John Wilson (born 1944) is a Canadian cattle rancher, veterinarian and former politician, who served as a BC Liberal Member of the Legislative Assembly of British Columbia from 1996 to 2005, representing the riding of Cariboo North. In 2010 he made an appearance in the season one finale of Dan for Mayor, as a representative of the Office of the Prime Minister.

Wilson studied at the Ontario Veterinary College at the University of Guelph and, after graduating in 1967, moved to Quesnel, British Columbia where he established the Quesnel Veterinary Clinic. He was president of the Quesnel Cattlemen's Association.

References 

British Columbia Liberal Party MLAs
1944 births
Living people
21st-century Canadian politicians
Canadian ranchers